Samuel Johnson (born 25 January 1984) is a Guinean footballer.

Career
Johnson played from 2004 to 2010 in Egypt for Baladeyet Al-Mahalla, Ismaily SC and El Geish. He also was a half year 2009 on loan in Kuwait by Kazma Sporting Club.

International career
Johnson was one of the twenty-three (23) players of the Syli National ("National Elephant") who participated at the 2008 26th African Nations Cup (CAN) in Ghana, West Africa, where the National Elephant reached the quarter final for the third consecutive time in six (6) years (2004 in Tunisia, 2006 in Egypt, and 2008 in Ghana).

Notes

External links

1984 births
Living people
Guinean footballers
Association football midfielders
Guinean expatriate footballers
Expatriate footballers in Egypt
Guinea international footballers
2008 Africa Cup of Nations players
Expatriate footballers in Kuwait
Kazma SC players
Kuwait Premier League players
Guinean expatriate sportspeople in Kuwait
Guinean expatriate sportspeople in Egypt
Egyptian Premier League players